Tikare may refer to:
Tikarè, Togo
Tikaré, Burkina Faso
Tikaré Department, Burkina Faso

See also
Tikar people, several ethnic groups in Cameroon